Aleuritopteris squamosa is a species of fern in the family Pteridaceae. It is endemic to China.  Its natural habitats are temperate forests and subtropical or tropical moist lowland forests. It is threatened by habitat loss.

References

squamosa
Flora of China
Endangered plants
Taxonomy articles created by Polbot